Colour-sided or lineback is a type of fur pattern in domesticated cattle. 

It consists of any solid body colour (such as black, red, or brindle) with white finching along the spine, along the underbelly, and over the tail, head, and legs. The ears, nose, and feet are generally left dark. An extreme pale form of the colour-sided pattern is where the darker colour is restricted to the ears, nose and feet, leaving most of the animal white.

The pattern occurs in many breeds, but some consistent examples include the English Longhorn cattle, Irish Moiled cattle, Randall Lineback cattle and Riggit Galloway cattle. 

Cattle